Kimball Township may refer to:

 Kimball Township, Michigan
 Kimball Township, Jackson County, Minnesota
 Kimball Township, Brule County, South Dakota, in Brule County, South Dakota

Township name disambiguation pages